"All Glocks Down" is the first single released from Heather B.'s debut album, Takin' Mine. It was released in 1995 and produced by Boogie Down Productions member Kenny Parker. "All Glocks Down" was a moderate success, making it to 15 on the Hot Rap Singles chart, becoming the most successful of the three singles released from the album.

Single track listing

A-Side
"All Glocks Down" (Radio Version)- 4:09  
"All Glocks Down" ("An L To The Neck" Version)- 4:32

B-Side
"All Glocks Down" (Extended Mixshow Version)- 5:44  
"All Glocks Down" (Fort Rowdy Mix)- 4:09  
"All Glocks Down" (Instrumental)- 4:07

1995 singles
1995 songs
EMI Records singles